The Lowveld massacre was an incident that occurred on 11 March 1986 at Kabokweni, in the Mpumalanga province of South Africa, when security forces opened fire on thousands of young people who had gathered outside the magistrate's court to protest during the trial of their fellow students.

Preceding events 
The massacre started with the killing of a student during a protest. During the funeral of the student, the army and the police shot at the mourners and arrested 26 students without provocation. At the trial of the 26 students there were further shootings of the students. Many were injured and some were killed.

Media and popular culture 
South African actor and playwright Mcedisi Shabangu has written a play based on this massacre.

References 

Opposition to apartheid in South Africa
Events associated with apartheid
Protests in South Africa
1986 in South Africa
1986 murders in South Africa
1980s massacres in South Africa